Neurobiology of Aging is a peer-reviewed monthly scientific journal published by Elsevier. The editor-in-chief is Peter R. Rapp. Neurobiology of Aging publishes research in which the primary emphasis addresses the mechanisms of nervous system-changes during aging and in age-related diseases. Approaches are behavioral, biochemical, cellular, molecular, morphological, neurological, neuropathological, pharmacological, and physiological.

Abstracting and indexing 
Neurobiology of Aging is abstracted and indexed in
 BIOSIS,
 Current Contents/Life Sciences,
 EMBASE,
 MEDLINE,
 PsycINFO,
 Research Alert,
 Science Citation Index,
 Scopus.
According to the Journal Citation Reports, Neurobiology of Aging has a 2020 impact factor of 4.673.

References

External links 
 

Gerontology journals
Life extension
Monthly journals
English-language journals
Elsevier academic journals
Publications established in 1980
Neuroscience journals